The Fontanabran is a mountain in the Chablais Alps in Switzerland.

References

External links
 Fontanabran on Hikr

Mountains of the Alps
Mountains of Valais
Mountains of Switzerland
Two-thousanders of Switzerland